Mariaparochie [ma'riaːpaˌrɔxi] is a village in the Dutch province of Overijssel. The greater part of it belongs to the municipality of Tubbergen while a small part, with the local church, belongs to Almelo. Mariaparochie lies about 4 km northeast of Almelo.

In 1918, the Our Lady of Perpetual Help Church was built and enlarged in 1923. In 1936, there was a settlement around the church. The village is twinned with Harbrinkhoek, but both still have separate place name signs, statistical entries and postal codes.

References

Populated places in Overijssel
Almelo
Tubbergen